Scientist of the Year Award is one of several awards given in South Korea by the Korea Science Journalists Association. From 1985, it was awarded to one individual. From 1999, it was given to three winners, each within their own category, which changed to one category and one winner in 1996, removed the category system from 2011, and allowed multiple winners the following year. Laureates receive a medal and 3 million KRW (roughly US$3,000) cash prize.

Other awards given by the Association include the Korea Science Journalist Award, Korea Medical Scholarship Award, Korean Medical Science Award, and Contribution Award for Science and Medicine PR.

Laureates
Spelling of laureates' names matches their Wikipedia page, if it exists, the remainder used Revised Romanization of Korean with the Korean Romanization Converter of Al Lab and Narainfotech. Job position and institution information are from the Korea Science Journalists Association's website.

References

Awards established in 1985
1985 establishments in South Korea
Science and technology awards